Night Ranger is an American hard rock band from San Francisco, California. Formed in 1979 under the name "Stereo", the group was originally a trio composed of former Rubicon members Jack Blades (bass, lead vocals), Kelly Keagy (drums, lead vocals) and Brad Gillis (guitar, backing vocals). In 1980, the group expanded to a five-piece with the addition of keyboardist Alan Fitzgerald and second guitarist Jeff Watson, as well as changing its name to "Ranger" and later Night Ranger. After four commercially successful albums, the band experienced its first lineup change in early 1988 when Fitzgerald left prior to the recording of Man in Motion. Jesse Bradman, one of the substitute performers on the album, subsequently joined the group full-time. After Blades announced his departure, Night Ranger officially broke up in April 1989.

Two years after disbanding, Night Ranger was reformed by Keagy and Gillis, who recruited Gary Moon as the replacement for Blades. In 1993, David Zajicek joined the band as touring guitarist and keyboardist. Following the release and touring of Feeding off the Mojo, Blades, Watson and Fitzgerald all returned to mark a reunion of the original five-piece lineup of Night Ranger, after being invited to tour Japan. Two more studio albums followed, before Fitzgerald was replaced in 2003 by Michael Lardie of Great White. Watson also left in April 2007, with Whitesnake's Reb Beach taking his place for subsequent tour dates. Following a Japanese tour shortly after Beach's arrival, Lardie was replaced by Christian Matthew Cullen. In January 2008, Joel Hoekstra joined the band full-time, as Beach returned to Whitesnake.

Following the addition of Hoekstra, the Night Ranger lineup remained stable for three years, until Eric Levy replaced Cullen on keyboards in March 2011. Hoekstra remained for two studio albums and one live release, before it was announced in August 2014 that he was leaving to join Beach in Whitesnake. He was soon replaced by Keri Kelli, who had previously substituted for Hoekstra during shows in 2012 and 2013.

Members

Current

Former

Touring

Timeline

Lineups

References

External links
Night Ranger official website

Night Ranger